The 2012–13 season is Sydney FC's eighth consecutive season in the A-League since its foundation season in 2005–2006.
Sydney started the season under the management of Ian Crook until his departure on 11 November 2012, being replaced by assistant coach Steve Corica who took up a caretaker role from 12 to 27 November. On 28 November Frank Farina was appointed as manager and Steve Corica returned to assistant coach.

Players

Senior squad

Out on loan

Youth squad

Transfers

Summer

In:

 
 
 
 
 
 

 
 
 
 
 

Out:

Winter

In:

Out:

Competitions

Overall

A-League

Preseason

Matches

Results by round

Results summary

League table

W-League

Regular season

Finals Series

Results summary

League table

League goalscorers by round

Squad statistics

Appearances and goals

|-
|colspan="14"|Players away from the club on loan:

|-
|colspan="14"|Players who appeared for Sydney FC no longer at the club:

|}

Disciplinary record

End-of-season awards
On 10 April 2013, Sydney FC hosted their annual Sky Blue Ball and presented seven awards on the night.

References

External links
 
 A-League website
 W-League website
 National Youth League website

2012-13
2012–13 A-League season by team